Kinchil Municipality (Yucatec Maya: "Place of the god Kinich") is one of the 106 municipalities in the Mexican state of Yucatán containing (160.95 km2) of land and is located roughly  west of the city of Mérida.

History
There is no accurate data on when the town was founded, but it was a settlement before the conquest and was located in the chieftainship of Ah Canul. After colonization, the area became part of the encomienda system with various encomenderos, with Pedro Castellanos and Petrona Magaña Dorantes serving at different times. 

Yucatán declared its independence from the Spanish Crown in 1821 and in 1825 the area was assigned to the Hunucma Municipality. In 1900 the area became its own municipality.

Governance
The municipal president is elected for a three-year term. The town council has four councilpersons, who serve as Secretary and councilors of heritage and monuments; public works and public cleanliness; roads; and public buildings.

The Municipal Council administers the business of the municipality. It is responsible for budgeting and expenditures and producing all required reports for all branches of the municipal administration. Annually it determines educational standards for schools.

The Police Commissioners ensure public order and safety. They are tasked with enforcing regulations, distributing materials and administering rulings of general compliance issued by the council.

Communities
The head of the municipality is Kinchil, Yucatán. The municipality has 6 populated places besides the seat including Bella Flor and Tamchén. The significant populations are shown below:

Local festivals
Every year on 24 May the town celebrates the feast of its patron, Christ of the Blisters.

Tourist attractions
 Church of Christ of the Blisters, built in the sixteenth century
 Hacienda Tamchén

References

Municipalities of Yucatán